The Human Zoo, a radio programme on talkSPORT, was presented by Tommy Boyd, with his engineer Asher Gould effectively acting as co-presenter. It was broadcast from May 2000 until Boyd's dismissal in March 200 and took its name from a 1969 book of the same name by Desmond Morris.

Format 
The programme had a straightforward 'phone in' format, except that callers were unscreened, went straight to air, and could say whatever they wanted, broadcasting regulations permitting. This unique radio experiment attained cult status and quickly became the most popular programme on AM radio in Britain. At the peak of its popularity in the summer of 2001, up to a million calls were received throughout the four-hour programme.

While not the most original format for radio, the Human Zoo was wildly successful. This has been attributed to the particular style of its presenter, who encouraged a very wide variety of callers to contribute, including some who called in to give short performances, play pieces of prepared audio or just shout out catchphrases. "Can I pleasure your wife?" was an oft-repeated slogan. Therefore, the mainstay of the programme for its listeners was the unpredictable nature of where the discussion would lead next. Very weighty issues not often discussed by mainstream phone on the radio (which Boyd derided as all about "points missed in the debate so far") could be juxtaposed with frivolous, light-hearted or comedic items. Boyd divided opinion between devoted fans, many of whom considered him to be an extremely wise man and critics who viewed him as arrogant or mad, often taking the opportunity to phone up to launch personal attacks or deride his ideas to start heated and vitriolic arguments.

Boyd attributed the popularity of the show to the ability of its anarchic nature to strike a chord with people on a Sunday night, and elaborated on this theory many times, proposing that Sunday evenings induced a widespread and overwhelming mood of either resignation or defiance and that the programme provided an outlet to those who felt trapped by the prospect of school, college or work the following morning.

Demise 
In its latter stages, the Human Zoo became increasingly repetitive and at times descended into farce. Despite Boyd's efforts to reinvigorate the format, it became dominated by a small coterie of callers.

An important part of the production of the programme was the need to prevent the broadcast of offensive or illegal material by callers who knew that they were being granted an open platform for whatever they had to say before a national audience. This was achieved by a facility known as the dump button, often employed in phones in radio for this purpose. The station's output was broadcast several seconds after it was produced in the studio, allowing a small amount of time for the station to be silenced after unwanted comments had been made.

Revival 
The Human Zoo would be revived to a lesser extent when Boyd began presenting a late Saturday night show on BBC Southern Counties Radio in September 2004. Regular callers included a Johnny Vegas soundalike, someone reading the results of the day's games in the Premier League or the FA Cup, someone doing an impression of Darth Vader breathing, "The Duck", and "Quarter-to-One Mick", a Northern accented gentleman who each week would recite the lyrics of well-known songs towards the end of each show.

In 2007, Tommy Boyd joined Play Radio UK to co-host a Sunday night phone-in show with Duncan Barkes. Calls went unscreened, and as the station is internet-only and not regulated by Ofcom, there was no need for a dump button and callers were allowed to say things not usually permitted on most UK radio stations that broadcast on regulated media. Having left the station towards the end of 2007 for a brief spell, Boyd returned to the station in mid-2008 with a similar format.

Similar formats 
Similar straight-to-air formats have been used in British radio. Nick Abbot took calls straight to air in a segment he named the "Lightning Round". Iain Lee began a segment on his afternoon show known as "Triple M" which was given its 3-hour slot in the LBC Sunday night schedule until the format fell out of favour with new station management. "Triple M" was part of Iain Lee's show on Absolute Radio which is also on a Sunday Night. The format has continued occasionally on Lee's Talkradio show. LBC's late-night host Clive Bull also had a straight-to-air section at the end of his show, which was also ended under LBC's new management, to move the station to more serious news topics. James Whale used similar tactics which he called "Fast & Furious" toward the end of his 10pm till 2shows on Radio Aire in the mid-1980s.

British talk radio programmes
2000 radio programme debuts